The 2020–21 season was Fatih Karagümrük S.K.'s 95th season in existence and the club's first season back in the top flight of Turkish football following promotion from the TFF First League. In addition to the domestic league, Fatih Karagümrük S.K. will participate in this season's edition of the Turkish Cup. The season covers the period from July 2020 to 30 June 2021.

Players

Current squad

Transfers

In

Out

Pre-season and friendlies

Competitions

Overview

Süper Lig

League table

Results summary

Results by round

Matches

Turkish Cup

References

External links

Fatih Karagümrük S.K. seasons
Fatih Karagümrük